Tam Shek-wing (born 1935), pen name Wong Ting Tze or Wang Tingzhi, is a Buddhist scholar, painter, poet, writer and social critic, the founder of the Sino-Tibetan Buddhist Studies Association in North America, and a professor at Renmin University of China.

Tam was born in Guangzhou and resides in Canada.

Biography and Buddhist lineage 
Tam Shek-wing was born in Guangdong, China in 1935. At childhood, he followed senior family members to practice Oriental Esoteric Buddhism. He was immensely interested in Buddhist texts ever since at the age of twelve while entering into the Western Sect of the Taoist practice.

In the 60s, he started learning Tibetan Buddhism when he was converted in Taiwan under Chu Yung-kuang, a disciple of Norlha Rinpoche as well as Gangkar Rinpoche, and was bestowed with the teachings of the Riwoche system. Later, Chu suggested Tam to contact one of his disciples in Hong Kong - Lau Yui Chi. Subsequently, Tam joined the Hong Kong Vajrayana Esoteric Society founded by Lau. From 1972 onwards however, Tam was practising the Nyingma teachings under the direct instruction of Dudjom Rinpoche and Lau Yui Chi, and was ordained Vajra Acarya of the Nyingma School at the age of 38 by Dudjom Rinpoche. He moved to Hawaii in 1986, and has resided in Canada since 1993.

Under the guidance of Dudjom Rinpoche, Tam successively received transmitted instructions and is the lineage-holder of, among others, the following five principal Nyingma teachings:
 rgyud gsang ba snying po (Tantra of the Secret Nucleus, Guhyagarbhatantra)
 rDor sems thugs kyi sgrub pa (Sheer Clear Light)
 kar gling zhi khro dgongs pa rang grol (Peaceful and Wrathful Deities, the Natural Liberation of Intention by Karma Lingpa)
 rdo rje phur pa (Vajrakila)
 lce btsun snying tig (The Heart Essence of Chetsun)
In 1984, Tam was ordered by Dudjom Rinpoche to spread the Dharma teachings in his designated mission regions, namely North America and Mainland China.

Tam is a leading exponent of the Buddhist Tathagatagarbha thought in writings and in talks. Applying the Nyingmapa insights, he defends the Tathagatagarbha thought which was under attack by various Han and Japanese Buddhist scholars who deem it as non-Buddhist.

In recent years, Tam initiated the organization of the Sino-Tibetan Buddhist Studies Association in North America, which was joined by more than twenty international scholars in the discipline. He is a professor at Renmin University of China where he gives video course lectures attended by graduate students from Beijing University, Tsinghua University, Capital University, and Minzu University of China. Most recently, he has become a board member of the Academic Advisory Board, Faculty of Nationalist Studies of Tsinghua University.

Tam has written, edited or translated over 80 works in Buddhism. His other writings spread over I Ching, Chinese astrology, feng shui, fine arts, gastronomy and social critics. Wong Ting Tze is one of the most well known pen names of Tam for the above subjects.

References

External links
 Tam Shek-wing's paintings

1935 births
Living people
Canadian Buddhists
Chinese scholars of Buddhism
People's Republic of China Buddhists
People's Republic of China essayists
Writers from Guangzhou
Artists from Guangzhou
Painters from Guangdong
Academic staff of Renmin University of China
Educators from Guangdong
Buddhist artists
20th-century Buddhists
21st-century Buddhists